University of Arkansas Grantham (UA Grantham) is a public online university based in Little Rock, Arkansas. Founded in 1951 as Grantham Radio License School, it would eventually be renamed Grantham University. The then-for-profit school offered distance-education programs from 1951 until 2021, at which point it was entirely online. Grantham was purchased by the University of Arkansas System for one dollar in 2021, merging with the latter’s eVersity online program. It is composed of four colleges: the College of Business, Management, and Economics; the College of Humanities and Social Sciences; the College of Science, Engineering, and Technology; and the College of Nursing and Health Professions. It is accredited by the Distance Education Accrediting Commission.

History
The university started as Grantham Radio License School, a private school founded in 1951, in Los Angeles. Its founder, Donald Grantham, was an engineer and World War II veteran who offered Federal Communications Commission License certification courses to other World War II veterans after returning from the war. Through the 1950s and 1960s additional campuses were opened in Washington, D.C.; Hollywood, California; Seattle, Washington; and Kansas City, Missouri. In 1961, the university received formal recognition by the U.S. Department of Education., when the Grantham School of Electronics (GSE) became accredited by the Distance Education Accrediting Commission. In 1968, the GSE was renamed the Grantham College of Engineering (GCE). A second Los Angeles campus was established in 1974. In subsequent years, GCE moved all of its operations to the Los Angeles location and offered distance learning programs exclusively. In 1990, GCE obtained approval to operate in Louisiana and relocated to Slidell.  It was licensed by the Louisiana Board of Regents in 1993.

In 2005, Hurricane Katrina hit Grantham's main campus in Slidell, Louisiana, destroying approximately eighty percent of their facilities. Days later, more than 140 employees had the university up and running again in temporary offices in Kansas City, Missouri. The school decided to relocate to Kansas City and secured a certificate to operate from the Missouri Department of Higher Education. In June 2006, Grantham signed articulation agreements with Bellevue University and Central Wyoming College. In January 2007, Grantham signed a memorandum of understanding with the Defense Acquisition University (DAU) to accept educational credit earned through successful completion of DAU courses and programs as transfer or elective credit at Grantham.

In November 2021, Grantham joined the University of Arkansas System to officially become University of Arkansas Grantham. By summer 2022, the system's original online college initiative, eVersity, merged with UA Grantham to form one institution.

Academics

College of Business, Management, and Economics
In December 2015, the school received specialized accreditation for its business programs through the International Assembly for Collegiate Business Education (IACBE).

College of Science, Engineering, and Technology
The College of Science, Engineering, and Technology oversees a number of different programs and courses, including associate degrees, bachelor's degrees and course offerings from project management, digital systems, physics, calculus, differential equations, and programming. In September 2016, the school received accreditation for its Bachelor of Science in electronics engineering technology program through the Accreditation Board for Engineering and Technology (ABET).

College of Humanities and Social Sciences
The College of Humanities and Social Sciences offers courses that are aimed at strengthening basic skills in writing, speaking, critical thinking and quantitative reasoning. The arts courses include writing and communication, while the sciences include knowledge of the natural world and human civilization.

College of Nursing and Health Professions
The College of Nursing and Health Professions is the newest college. In 2010, the school offered its first online RN-to-BSN program. In 2016, it was awarded program "candidate" status by the Accrediting Commission for Education in Nursing (ACEN). Initial ACEN accreditation for the Baccalaureate and Master's programs in nursing was granted in March 2019. On October 21, 2019, the Baccalaureate and Master's nursing programs received initial accreditation from the Commission of Collegiate Nursing Education (CCNE)

Accreditation

University of Arkansas Grantham has been nationally accredited by the Distance Education Accreditation Commission (DEAC), formerly the Distance Education and Training Council, since 1961.  Additionally, as a member of the University of Arkansas System, UA Grantham credits may be transferred to other system universities. The other members of the UA System are regionally accredited by the Higher Learning Commission.

Faculty

University of Arkansas Grantham employs 36 full-time instructors and 255 adjunct instructors.

References

External links
 
 

University of Arkansas System
Educational institutions established in 1951
Distance Education Accreditation Commission
Distance education institutions based in the United States